Heckman is a surname. Notable people with the surname include:

Charles Adam Heckman, brigadier general in the Union Army during the American Civil War
James Heckman (born 1944), American economist and Nobel laureate
John Heckman (1785–1871), political figure in Nova Scotia
Lonny Heckman (1969–2007), American songwriter and musician
Ron Heckman (1929–1990), English footballer who played as a left winger in the Football League
Ryan Heckman (born 1974), American Nordic combined skier who competed from 1992 to 1997
Steven Heckman, American Nordic combined skier who competed in the 1990s

See also
Heckman Pass, mountain pass in the Rainbow Range of west-central British Columbia, Canada
Heckman's Island, Nova Scotia, community in the Canadian province of Nova Scotia
Duistermaat–Heckman formula, due to Duistermaat and Heckman (1982)
Heckman–Opdam polynomials, Pλ(k), orthogonal polynomials in several variables associated to root systems
Heckman correction, statistical methods developed by James Heckman in 1976–1979 which allow the researcher to correct for selection bias